Siadak or Siyadak may refer to:
 Siadak, Hirmand
 Siadak Deh Mardeh, Hirmand County
 Siadak, Sib and Suran